Devon Walker (born February 13, 1991) is an American stand-up comedian, actor, and writer. In 2022, Walker joined the cast of the NBC sketch comedy series Saturday Night Live as a featured player for the show's 48th season.

Life and career
Walker was raised in the Texas cities of Austin and Pflugerville. He has a graduate degree.

Walker began his comedy career in Austin around 2015. He moved to New York City in 2018, where he hosts the monthly comedy show Dad with comics Alex English and Gary Richardson at The Jane.

Walker gained early support from Comedy Central. In 2017, he was chosen for their Up Next showcase, and in 2019, he had his own special on Comedy Central Stand-Up Featuring. He has created and appeared in a number of the network's digital shorts. Walker was a writer for the animated Netflix comedy Big Mouth and the 2022 Freeform comedy series Everything's Trash.

References

External links

Year of birth missing (living people)
21st-century American actors
21st-century American comedians
American male comedians
American male television actors
American male television writers
American sketch comedians
American stand-up comedians
Male actors from Austin, Texas
Comedians from Texas
Living people